Jamesville Colony is a census-designated place (CDP) and Hutterite colony in Yankton County, South Dakota, United States. The population was 110 at the 2020 census. It was first listed as a CDP prior to the 2020 census.

It is in the northwest part of the county, on the north side of the James River.

Demographics

References 

Census-designated places in Yankton County, South Dakota
Census-designated places in South Dakota
Hutterite communities in the United States